Kalipatnam Ramarao (9 November 1924 – 4 June 2021), known as Kara Master, was an Indian poet and writer known for his Telugu short stories. He won Sahitya Akademi Award in Telugu, 1995 for his short stories Yajnam To Tommidi.

Career
Kalipatnam was born in 1924 in Murapaka, Srikakulam, India. He worked as a teacher for many years at St. Anthony's High School in Visakhapatnam and retired in 1979. Inspired by Kalipatnam Rama Rao, writer Yandamuri Veerendranath began his writing career. He considers him as Guru. Rama Rao's stories reflect the trials, tribulations, and occasionally the triumphs of life among the middle and lower classes of people in society. Kalipatnam is especially known for his psychological insights and his incisive analytical abilities regarding the social, economical, and political influences on daily life.

His first story, "Chitragupta", was a mini-story, written on the back of a postcard. He was not satisfied with his writing and stopped in 1955. After 8 years, he wrote "Teerpu" in 1963. He wrote many stories in the late 1960s following "Teerpu", including "Yagnam", "mahadaaseervacanamu", "veerudu-mahaveerudu", "Adivaram", "Himsa", "No room", "Sneham", "Arthi", "Bhayam", "Santhi", "Chavu", "Jevvana dhara", and "Kutra". After writing "Kutra", he stopped writing. He has said that in his early days he would write a lot, but would not send them for publication as he wasn't happy with what he wrote. In later days, he wrote about one or two stories a year. His stories have since been translated into various foreign languages including Russian and English.

Kalipatnam was also a member of the executive committee of the Viplava Rachayitala Sangham. He won the "Central Cultural Academy award" in 1995, and was felicitated by Loknayak foundation (Visakhapatnam) on 18 January 2008.

Abroad
In the last 15 years, Kalipatnam was active in publishing short story anthologies of other writers. He was in US in 1993, as a guest of the 9th TANA Conference - World Telugu Convention in New York (Dr. Kalasapoodi Sreenivassa Raavu and Yerramilli Padmaavathi of the literary committee were instrumental in bringing him there). In 2014, Kalipatnam's 90th birth anniversary was celebrated by his fans around AP. At that time, he hinted that he may start writing again.

Katha Nilayam

Kalipatnam started Katha Nilayam on 22 February 1997 as a research center and library to pass on Telugu literature to subsequent generations. The center is located in Visakha 'A' colony in Srikakulam..Currently, the center houses more than 5000 weeklies, monthlies, and special additions, as well as a wide variety of Telugu magazines.

LokSabha Honour

The message of Loksabha speaker in the felicitation of Kalipatnam Ramarao is as follows:

Shri Kalipatnam Rama Rao, affectionately called ‘Ka Ra Mastaru’ in the Telugu literary world, is one such luminary who   has had an ennobling literary career spanning nearly six decades. Shri Rama Rao’s writings reflect the social milieu of his own moorings, of the real life, experiences and difficulties he encountered in his younger days.  It is these real-life experiences that equipped him to view the society around him with a critical eye, distancing himself from the class and caste system prevalent then and with immense love and affection for the poor and the downtrodden.  His great story ‘Yagnam’ which he wrote way back in 1964, for which he was honoured with the prestigious the Central Sahitya Academy Award,  poignantly depicted the feudal set up in a village. Shri Rama Rao’s stories are indeed incisive  reflections on the social structure, conditions and class system of the times which unfortunately conditioned social behaviour and preferences than other higher values. In fact, Shri Rama Rao’s stories have left a deep impact on the readers and his felicitous writings have won him a very large number of admirers.  Thanks to the translation of his works into Russian, English and many Indian languages, his stories have touched a deep chord among people far and wide.

Written works
 Yajnam To Tommidi (Short Stories)
 Yagnam (Novel)
 Abhimanalu 
 Ragamayi
 Jeevadhara
 mahadaaseervacanamu
veerudu-mahaveerudu
Adivaram
Himsa
No room
Sneham"

Awards
 Nandi Award for Second Best Story Writer - Yagnam

References

External links

History of Kalipatnam Ramarao
interview in "Prajakala"
The essay in "Thats telugu"

1924 births
2021 deaths
Telugu writers
Telugu poets
Indian male short story writers
People from Srikakulam district
20th-century Indian short story writers
Writers from Andhra Pradesh
Indian male poets
20th-century Indian poets
20th-century Indian male writers
People from Uttarandhra
Recipients of the Sahitya Akademi Award in Telugu